Sayre School is an independent, co-educational school in Lexington, Kentucky, US. The school enrolls 610 students from preschool to twelfth grade. It has 68 full-time faculty members.

History
David A. Sayre, a New Jersey silversmith, migrated to Lexington where he eventually became a successful banker. He and his wife Abby founded the school as an all-female boarding school in November 1854 when he met with a group of businessmen in the offices of former Kentucky Secretary of State George B. Kinkead. Along with several other prominent members of the "McChord" (now First) Presbyterian Church, including John C. Breckinridge, the group drew up the school's articles of incorporation.

In the fall of 1855, the school was moved to its current location on Limestone Street.

The school remained an all-female boarding school until 1876, when boys were admitted as day scholars in the primary grades under the leadership of Major Henry B. McClelland, who was the school's principal from 1870 to 1904. In 1914, the nearby preparatory school of Miss Ella M. Williams merged with Sayre, and the name was changed to Sayre College and Conservatory of Music. During the Great Depression, the school struggled, but in 1942 it grew with the incorporation of the Hamilton Grammar School, and changed its name to Sayre School, dropping its collegiate degree program. The pillars outside the main entrance of the campus still show "Sayre College." In 1947 the high school grades were discontinued, and the boarding rooms were leased to the University of Kentucky. In 1961 an English teacher from Lafayette High School, Donn D. Hollingsworth, was appointed headmaster and the high school was reinstated, in addition to the grammar school, beginning the "New Era."

In March-April of 2017, Sayre begun the demolition and reconstruction of the lower (elementary) school, only finishing in summer of 2018.

Academics
The Sayre School consists of three academic divisions, covering ages 2 through grade 12. The Lower School consists of a preschool program for ages 2–5, as well as Kindergarten through Grade 4. The Middle School covers grades 5-8, and the Upper School incorporates grades 9-12, like a traditional high school. The Upper School offers 17 Advanced Placement courses, and 85% of seniors who took an AP class earned a score of 3 or higher, with 60% being designated as AP Scholars; two were National AP Scholars.

People
Since Sayre is no longer a boarding school, most of its students reside in Lexington, Kentucky or its nearby counties, such as Scott, Bourbon, Jessamine, Madison, and Woodford counties. Students come from 13 Central Kentucky counties, including Fleming and Estill counties, that are more than an hour commute away.

Tuition
The school is the most expensive college preparatory institution in the Bluegrass region, charging $7,040 to $26,625 a year for tuition. Over 30% of students receive tuition assistance.

Notable alumni

Notable past Sayre students include Nobel Laureate William Lipscomb, woman suffragist Laura Clay, settlement school founder Katherine Pettit, Josh Hopkins, Byrd Spilman Dewey and actress Ashley Judd.

Athletics
Sayre's sports teams are called the Spartans. Their school colors are blue and gold. Notably, the school has a "no-cut" policy for its sports teams, meaning that any student can participate on an athletic team, regardless of ability, if he or she wishes to do so.

References

External links
 

1854 establishments in Kentucky
educational institutions established in 1854
history of women in Kentucky
preparatory schools in Kentucky
private elementary schools in Kentucky
private high schools in Kentucky
private middle schools in Kentucky
schools in Lexington, Kentucky
National Register of Historic Places in Lexington, Kentucky
School buildings on the National Register of Historic Places in Kentucky